The 1973 U.S. Professional Indoor was a men's tennis tournament played on indoor carpet courts at the Spectrum in Philadelphia, Pennsylvania in the United States that was part of the 1973 World Championship Tennis circuit. It was the sixth edition of the tournament and was held from February 6 through February 11, 1973. Third-seeded Stan Smith won the singles title.

Finals

Singles

 Stan Smith defeated  Robert Lutz 7–6(7–2), 7–6(7–5), 4–6, 6–4
 It was Smith's 1st title of the year and the 28th of his career.

Doubles

 Brian Gottfried /  Dick Stockton defeated  Roy Emerson /  Rod Laver 4–6, 6–3, 6–4
 It was Gottfried's 1st title of the year and the 1st of his career. It was Stockton's 1st title of the year and the 1st of his career.

References

External links
 ITF tournament edition details

U.S. Professional Indoor
U.S. Pro Indoor
U.S. Professional Indoor
U.S. Professional Indoor
U.S. Professional Indoor